Mesostenus is a genus of ichneumon wasps in the family Ichneumonidae. There are at least 50 described species in Mesostenus.

Species
These 58 species belong to the genus Mesostenus:

 Mesostenus albinotatus Gravenhorst, 1829 c g
 Mesostenus alvarengae Porter, 1973 c g
 Mesostenus americanus Cresson, 1878 c g
 Mesostenus angustus Townes, 1944 c g
 Mesostenus ater Ratzeburg, 1852 c g
 Mesostenus aureli Ciochia, 1973 c g
 Mesostenus azerbajdzhanicus Abdinbekova, 1961 c g
 Mesostenus cingulatellus Costa, 1886 c
 Mesostenus clitellatus Townes, 1962 c g
 Mesostenus coreanus (Kim, 1955) c
 Mesostenus corsicus (Szepligeti, 1916) c
 Mesostenus crassifemur Thomson, 1888 c
 Mesostenus curvipes Taschenberg, 1876 c g
 Mesostenus cuzcensis Porter, 1973 c g
 Mesostenus dentifer Thomson, 1896 c
 Mesostenus eisenii Ashmead, 1894 c g
 Mesostenus euoplus Porter, 1973 c g
 Mesostenus fidalgoi Porter, 1974 c g
 Mesostenus funebris Gravenhorst, 1829 c g
 Mesostenus gracilis Cresson, 1864 c b
 Mesostenus grammicus Gravenhorst, 1829 c g
 Mesostenus gravenhorstii Spinola, 1840 c g
 Mesostenus hypsipylaphagous Herrera-Florez, Diaz & Quiroz-Gamboa, 2017 g
 Mesostenus kozlovi Kokujev, 1909 c g
 Mesostenus lanarius Gistel, 1857 c g
 Mesostenus liogaster Townes, 1962 c g
 Mesostenus longicaudis Cresson, 1872 c g
 Mesostenus melanurus Cushman, 1929 c g
 Mesostenus modestus Brues, 1906 c g
 Mesostenus modicus Cresson, 1874 c g
 Mesostenus nepomis Porter, 1973 c g
 Mesostenus obtusus Momoi, 1966 c g
 Mesostenus opuntiae Porter, 1977 c g
 Mesostenus penetralis (Cameron, 1902) c g
 Mesostenus pertenuis Cresson, 1874 c g
 Mesostenus pluvialis Porter, 1973 c g
 Mesostenus punctatus (Szépligeti, 1908) c
 Mesostenus roborowskii Kokujev, 1909 c
 Mesostenus rufalbator Aubert, 1959 c g
 Mesostenus ruficoxis (Szepligeti, 1916) c g
 Mesostenus rufipes (Kim, 1955) c g
 Mesostenus rufoniger Meyer, 1922 c g
 Mesostenus rufotinctus Provancher, 1874 c g
 Mesostenus schmiedeknechti Ciochia, 1973 c g
 Mesostenus sicarius Townes, 1962 c g
 Mesostenus subandinus Porter, 1973 c g
 Mesostenus suigensis Uchida, 1930 c g
 Mesostenus terani Porter, 1973 c g
 Mesostenus thoracicus Cresson, 1864 c g b
 Mesostenus townesi Kanhekar & Nikam, 1989 c g
 Mesostenus transfuga Gravenhorst, 1829 c g
 Mesostenus tricarinatus Cameron, 1906 c g
 Mesostenus truncatidens Schmiedeknecht, 1905 c g
 Mesostenus turcator Aubert, 1972 c g
 Mesostenus versicolor Viereck, 1912 c g
 Mesostenus xerobates Porter, 1974 c g
 Mesostenus xestus Porter, 1973 c g
 Mesostenus yacochuyae Porter, 1973 c g

Data sources: i = ITIS, c = Catalogue of Life, g = GBIF, b = Bugguide.net

References

Further reading

External links

 

Parasitic wasps